Ralph Ashley Horr (August 12, 1884 – January 26, 1960) was an American politician who served as a member of the United States House of Representatives from 1931 to 1933. He represented the first congressional district of Washington as a Republican.

Horr ran unsuccessfully for mayor of Seattle, Washington in 1918 as a member of the Republican Party.

Horr won the Republican party's nomination for the seat then held by long-serving Republican John Franklin Miller in 1930. He was defeated two years later for renomination by Miller, who went on to lose the general election to Democrat Marion Zioncheck. Horr later lost races for United States Senate in 1934, for governor of Washington in 1936, and for mayor of Seattle in 1948.

References

1884 births
1960 deaths
Republican Party members of the United States House of Representatives from Washington (state)
20th-century American politicians